The Bahamas national beach soccer team represents The Bahamas in international beach soccer competitions and is controlled by the Bahamas Football Association, the governing body for football in the Bahamas.

Current squad

Current staff
 National Team Manager: Jason McDowall
 Coach: Luiz Escobar Passos Da Silva
 Assistant Coach: Wilson DaCosta

Achievements
CONCACAF Beach Soccer Championship Best: Sixth Place
2009, 2011, 2013, 2015, 2017, 2019
FIFA Beach Soccer World Cup Bahamas 2017 Finish: Tenth Place

External links
Facility
beachsoccer.com
BahamasFA.com (official site)

North American national beach soccer teams
Beach Soccer